Joel Johnson (born September 8, 2000) is a Bahamian sprinter who mainly competes in the 100m and 200m. He broke the Junior National Record for the 100m with a 10.31 (+1.1w) run to win the 2018 CARIFTA Games in front of home crowd. He helped his high school St. Augustine's College win their 28th Track and Field title at the B.A.I.S.S Track and Field Championships. He broke his own Junior National record in 2019 running a time of 10.19 (+0.4)

Personal bests

References

2000 births
Living people
People from Nassau, Bahamas
Bahamian male sprinters